This is a list of the Canadian electoral districts used between 1997 and 2003.  During this period, the House of Commons of Canada had 301 seats.  This arrangement was used in the 1997 federal election, the 2000 federal election. The Ontario ridings were used in the 1999 and 2003 provincial elections.

Newfoundland - 7 seats
Bonavista—Trinity—Conception
Burin—St. George's
Gander—Grand-Falls
Humber—St. Barbe—Baie Verte
Labrador
St. John's East
St. John's West

Prince Edward Island - 4 seats
Cardigan
Egmont
Hillsborough
Malpeque

Nova Scotia - 11 seats
Bras d'Or (renamed Bras d'Or—Cape Breton in 1998)
Cumberland—Colchester
Dartmouth
Halifax
Halifax West
Kings—Hants
Pictou—Antigonish—Guysborough
Sackville—Eastern Shore (renamed Sackville—Musquodoboit Valley—Eastern Shore in 1999)
South Shore
Sydney—Victoria
West Nova

New Brunswick - 10 seats
Acadie—Bathurst
Beauséjour—Petitcodiac (Beauséjour prior to 1997)
Charlotte (renamed New Brunswick Southwest in 1998)
Fredericton
Fundy—Royal
Madawaska—Restigouche
Miramichi
Moncton (renamed Moncton—Riverview—Dieppe in 1998)
Saint John
Tobique—Mactaquac

Quebec - 75 seats
Abitibi—Baie-James—Nunavik (Abitibi prior to 1998)
Ahuntsic
Anjou—Rivière-des-Prairies
Argenteuil—Papineau—Mirabel (Argenteuil—Papineau prior to 1999)
Beauce
Beauharnois—Salaberry
Beauport—Montmorency—Côte-de-Beaupré—Île-d'Orléans (Beauport—Montmorency—Orléans prior to 1998)
Bellechasse—Etchemins—Montmagny—L'Islet (Bellechasse—Montmagny—L'Islet prior to 1997)
Berthier—Montcalm
Bonaventure—Gaspé—Îles-de-la-Madeleine—Pabok (Gaspé—Bonaventure—Îles-de-la-Madeleine prior to 1997)
Bourassa
Brome—Missisquoi
Brossard—La Prairie
Chambly
Champlain
Charlesbourg—Jacques-Cartier (Charlesbourg prior to 2000)
Charlevoix
Châteauguay
Chicoutimi—Le Fjord (Chicoutimi prior to 2000)
Compton—Stanstead
Drummond
Frontenac—Mégantic
Gatineau
Hochelaga—Maisonneuve
Hull—Aylmer
Joliette
Jonquière
Kamouraska—Rivière-du-Loup—Temiscouata—Les Basques (Kamouraska—Rivière-du-Loup—Temiscouata prior to 1997)
Lac-Saint-Louis
Lac-Saint-Jean—Saguenay (Lac-Saint-Jean prior to 2000)
LaSalle—Émard
Laurentides
Laurier—Sainte-Marie
Laval Centre
Laval East
Laval West
Lévis-et-Chutes-de-la-Chaudière (Lévis prior to 1998)
Longueuil
Lotbinière—L'Érable (Lotbinière prior to 2000)
Louis-Hébert
Manicouagan
Matapédia—Matane
Mercier
Mount Royal
Notre-Dame-de-Grâce—Lachine (Lachine—Notre-Dame-de-Grâce prior to 1997)
Outremont
Papineau—Saint-Denis
Pierrefonds—Dollard
Pontiac—Gatineau—Labelle
Portneuf
Québec
Quebec East
Repentigny
Richelieu (renamed Bas-Richelieu—Nicolet—Bécancour in 1998)
Richmond—Arthabaska
Rimouski—Neigette-et-La-Mitis (Known as Rimouski prior to 1997 and Rimouski—Mitis from 1997 to 2000)
Roberval
Rosemont—Petite-Patrie (Rosemont prior to 2000)
Saint-Bruno—Saint-Hubert (Saint-Hubert prior to 1997)
Saint-Eustache—Sainte-Thérèse (renamed Rivière-des-Mille-Îles in 1998)
Saint-Hyacinthe—Bagot
Saint-Jean
Saint-Lambert
Saint-Laurent—Cartierville
Saint-Léonard—Saint-Michel
Saint-Maurice
Shefford
Sherbrooke
Témiscamingue (Rouyn-Noranda—Témiscamingue prior to 1997)
Terrebonne—Blainville
Trois-Rivières
Vaudreuil—Soulanges (Vaudreuil prior to 1997)
Verchères—Les Patriotes (Verchères prior to 1998)
Verdun—Saint-Henri (changed to Verdun—Saint-Henri—Saint-Paul—Pointe-Saint-Charles in 2000)
Westmount—Ville-Marie

Ontario - 103 seats
Algoma—Manitoulin (Algoma prior to 1997)
Ancaster—Dundas—Flamborough—Aldershot (Wentworth—Burlington prior to 2000)
Barrie—Simcoe—Bradford (Barrie—Simcoe prior to 1997)
Beaches—East York (Beaches—Woodbine prior to 1997)
Bramalea—Gore—Malton—Springdale (Bramalea—Gore—Malton prior to 1998)
Brampton Centre
Brampton West—Mississauga
Brant
Bruce—Grey—Owen Sound (Bruce—Grey prior to 2000)
Burlington
Cambridge
Chatham-Kent—Essex (Kent—Essex prior to 1998)
Davenport
Essex
Don Valley East
Don Valley West
Dufferin—Peel—Wellington—Grey
Durham
Eglinton—Lawrence
Elgin—Middlesex—London
Erie—Lincoln
Etobicoke Centre
Etobicoke North
Etobicoke—Lakeshore
Glengarry—Prescott—Russell
Guelph—Wellington
Haldimand—Norfolk—Brant
Haliburton—Victoria—Brock (Victoria—Haliburton prior to 1998)
Halton
Hamilton East
Hamilton—Mountain
Hamilton West
Hastings—Frontenac—Lennox and Addington
Huron—Bruce
Kenora—Rainy River
Kingston and the Islands
Kitchener Centre
Kitchener—Waterloo
Lambton—Kent—Middlesex
Lanark—Carleton
Leeds—Grenville
London—Fanshawe
London North-Centre (London—Adelaide prior to 1997)
London West
Markham
Mississauga Centre
Mississauga East
Mississauga South
Mississauga West
Nepean—Carleton
Niagara Centre
Niagara Falls
Nickel Belt
Nipissing
Northumberland
Oak Ridges
Oakville
Oshawa
Ottawa Centre
Ottawa—Orleans (Known as Gloucester—Carleton prior to 1997 and Carleton—Gloucester from 1997 to 2000)
Ottawa South
Ottawa—Vanier
Ottawa West—Nepean
Oxford
Parkdale—High Park
Parry Sound—Muskoka
Perth—Middlesex
Peterborough
Pickering—Ajax—Uxbridge
Prince Edward—Hastings
Renfrew—Nipissing—Pembroke
Sarnia—Lambton
Sault Ste. Marie
Scarborough—Agincourt
Scarborough Centre
Scarborough East
Scarborough—Rouge River
Scarborough Southwest
Simcoe—Grey
Simcoe North
St. Catharines
St. Paul's
Stormont—Dundas—Charlottenburgh (Stormont—Dundas prior to 1999)
Stoney Creek
Sudbury
Thornhill
Thunder Bay—Atikokan
Thunder Bay—Superior North (Thunder Bay—Nipigon prior to 1998)
Timiskaming—Cochrane
Timmins—James Bay
Toronto Centre—Rosedale
Toronto—Danforth (Broadview—Greenwood prior to 2000)
Trinity—Spadina
Vaughan—King—Aurora (Vaughan—Aurora prior to 1997)
Waterloo—Wellington
Whitby—Ajax
Willowdale
Windsor—St. Clair
Windsor West
York Centre
York North
York South—Weston
York West

Manitoba - 14 seats
Brandon—Souris
Charleswood—St. James—Assiniboia (Charleswood—Assiniboia prior to 1998)
Churchill
Dauphin—Swan River
Portage—Lisgar
Provencher
Saint Boniface
Selkirk—Interlake
Winnipeg Centre (Winnipeg North Centre prior to 1997)
Winnipeg North Centre (Winnipeg North prior to 1997)
Winnipeg North—St. Paul (Winnipeg—St. Paul prior to 1997)
Winnipeg South
Winnipeg South Centre
Winnipeg—Transcona

Saskatchewan - 14 seats
Battlefords—Lloydminster
Blackstrap
Churchill River
Cypress Hills—Grasslands
Palliser
Prince Albert
Regina—Lumsden—Lake Centre (Regina—Arm River prior to 1997)
Qu'Appelle (renamed Regina—Qu'Appelle in 1998)
Saskatoon—Humboldt
Saskatoon—Rosetown—Biggar (Saskatoon—Rosetown prior to 1997)
Saskatoon—Wanuskewin (Wanuskewin prior to 2000)
Souris—Moose Mountain
Wascana
Yorkton—Melville

Alberta - 26 seats
Athabasca
Calgary Centre
Calgary East
Calgary Northeast
Calgary—Nose Hill
Calgary Southeast
Calgary Southwest
Calgary West
Crowfoot
Edmonton Centre-East (Edmonton East prior to 2000)
Edmonton North
Edmonton Southeast
Edmonton Southwest
Edmonton—Strathcona
Edmonton West
Elk Island
Lakeland
Lethbridge
Macleod
Medicine Hat
Peace River
Red Deer
St. Albert
Wetaskiwin
Wild Rose
Yellowhead

British Columbia - 34 seats
Burnaby—Douglas
Cariboo—Chilcotin
Delta—South Richmond
Dewdney—Alouette
Esquimalt—Juan de Fuca
Fraser Valley
Kamloops, Thompson and Highland Valleys (Kamloops prior to 1998)
Kelowna
Kootenay—Columbia
Langley—Abbotsford (Langley—Matsqui prior to 1997)
Nanaimo—Alberni
Nanaimo—Cowichan
New Westminster—Coquitlam—Burnaby
North Vancouver
Okanagan—Coquihalla
Okanagan—Shuswap (North Okanagan–Shuswap prior to 1997)
Port Moody—Coquitlam (renamed Port Moody—Coquitlam—Port Coquitlam in 1998)
Prince George—Bulkley Valley
Prince George—Peace River
Richmond
Saanich—Gulf Islands
Skeena
South Surrey—White Rock—Langley
Surrey Central
Surrey North
Vancouver Centre
Vancouver East
Vancouver Island North
Vancouver Kingsway
Vancouver Quadra
Vancouver South—Burnaby
Victoria
West Vancouver—Sunshine Coast
West Kootenay—Okanagan (renamed Kootenay—Boundary—Okanagan in 1998)

Territories - 3 seats
Nunavut
Western Arctic
Yukon

1996-2003